The A-Rosa Aqua is a German river cruise ship, cruising in the Rhine – Main – Moselle basin. The ship was built by Neptun Werft GmbH at their shipyard in Warnemünde, Germany, and entered service in July 2009.  Her sister ships are A-Rosa Brava and A-Rosa Viva. Her home port is currently Rostock.

Features
The ship has two restaurants, lounge and two bars, Finnish sauna and resting area.

See also
 List of river cruise ships

References

External links

 A-Rosa Aqua Position and itinerary

2009 ships
River cruise ships